Gregorio C. Brillantes, a Palanca Award Hall of Famer and a multi-awarded fiction writer, is one of the Philippines' most popular writers in English.

Known for his sophisticated and elegant style, he has been compared to James Joyce. He often writes about individuals under thirty, adolescent or post adolescent ones who struggle with alienation from family, society and from themselves. His earlier collection of short stories earned him the title of the "Catholic Writer". But elements of the fantastic also come in his works. In the 2006 Graphic/Fiction Awards, the main local sponsor of the contest, specialty book shop Fully Booked, acknowledged Brillantes as one of the godfathers of fantastic literature in English by naming the first category the Gregorio C. Brillantes Prize for Prose.

Brillantes is a native of Camiling, Tarlac. He obtained his Litt. B. degree in the Ateneo de Manila University. He has edited Sunburst, The Manila Review, Focus, Asia-Philippines Leader and the Philippines Free Press. Among his published collections of short stories are: The Distance to Andromeda and Other Stories, The Apollo Centennial, Help, and On a Clear Day in November Shortly Before the Millennium, Stories for a Quarter Century.

He also has published collections of essays: Looking for Rizal in Madrid, Chronicles of Interesting Times, and The Cardinal's Sins, the General's Cross, the Martyr's Testimony and other Affirmations.

He acted as one of the judges of the Philippine Graphic Novel Awards in 2007. Lovely

References

External links
 "Puno lost judge-brother to assassin" - Philippine Daily Inquirer
 Full Text: The Apollo Centennial by Gregorio Brillantes

Ateneo de Manila University alumni
Filipino writers
Ilocano-language writers
Living people
Palanca Award recipients
People from Tarlac
Year of birth missing (living people)
Ilocano people